X-Men Origins: Wolverine is a hack-and-slash action-adventure video game based on the film X-Men Origins: Wolverine. The game release coincided with the release of the film on May 1, 2009, for the PlayStation 3, Xbox 360, Windows, Wii, PlayStation 2, Nintendo DS and PlayStation Portable. A version of the game was also released for mobile phones. The game was developed primarily by Raven Software through the use of Unreal Engine technology. The standard version was released for the PlayStation 2, PlayStation Portable, Wii (which is rated T) and for  Nintendo DS (which is rated E10+), while the Uncaged Edition is for the PlayStation 3, Xbox 360, and Microsoft Windows (which is rated M for more violence).

Following the expiration of Activision's licensing deal with Marvel, the game was de-listed and removed from all digital storefronts on January 1, 2014. It was the final Wolverine game published by Activision before the license expired in 2014. It was also the last standalone Wolverine video game to be released until the announcement of Marvel's Wolverine, currently being developed by Insomniac Games and to be published by Sony Interactive Entertainment for PlayStation 5.

Gameplay

X-Men Origins takes influences from games such as God of War and Devil May Cry with a third person perspective. The Uncaged Edition also features a large amount of blood and gore. Enemies can be slain in several ways in addition to the graphic display of Wolverine's healing factor.

Combat relies on three options - light attacks, heavy attacks, and grabs. Another form of attack is the lunge, which allows Wolverine to quickly close the distance to an enemy. Wolverine can also use the environment to his advantage, such as by impaling foes on spikes. During combat, Wolverine's rage meter builds up, and when full allows him to use more devastating attacks, like the claw spin and a berserker mode, which increases Wolverine's claw strength until his Rage Meter empties. Experience (XP) is collected from defeating enemies, destroying elements and accumulating collectibles. The XP is used to level up, and each new level results in gaining skill points, which are used to purchase upgrades.

The PlayStation 2 and Wii versions are less graphic, with less language and slightly different combat. Feral senses are still obtained, which can detect doors, traps, enemies and sentinel observers, and lunges must be performed at closer distances.

Synopsis
The story is a combination of the Wolverine backstory explored in the film and an original plot created by Raven Software, which was influenced by major events in the X-Men comic series.

Plot
In the prologue, set in a bleak urban environment, Wolverine kills a group of soldiers sent to kill him. His thoughts drift to a forgotten past.

The game begins in Angola, Africa, chronicling the final mission of Team X, led by Col. Stryker and his soldiers: James "Logan" Howlett/Wolverine, Logan's brother Victor Creed/Sabretooth, Wade Wilson, John Wraith, and Nord, to locate a village that holds the secret to a valuable mineral deposit (implied to be adamantium). Travelling through the jungle and ancient temples, they come across and slaughter numerous mercenaries and mutants attempting to stop them. When Raven, their CIA liaison, objects to Stryker harming innocent civilians, Stryker orders her terminated and Wraith seemingly kills her. Eventually, Team X locates the village but the villagers refuse to cooperate and Stryker threatens their lives. Logan turns on his teammates but he is subdued and knocked out before he can prevent the massacre of the villagers.

Three years later, Team X has mostly disbanded. Logan has settled in Canada with his girlfriend, Kayla Silverfox, when Creed surprises Logan at a bar and engages him in battle. Creed emerges victorious, breaks Logan's bone claws and knocks him unconscious. Logan awakens to find Kayla dead. Stryker arrives, telling Logan that Creed is killing his former comrades in revenge for Stryker firing him. He offers Logan a chance at revenge, via a procedure to bond the indestructible metal adamantium to his skeleton. Logan accepts, but when the procedure ends, he overhears Stryker order him to be terminated. He breaks out of the Alkali Lake facility in a rage, killing many of Stryker's men attempting to stop him, including Nord, and vowing to kill Stryker and Creed.

Searching for Wraith, Logan travels to Project: Wideawake, a secret government facility producing mutant hunting Sentinel robots. There, he comes across Raven, who is also searching for Wraith and is revealed to be a mutant shapeshifter; she explains to Logan that Wraith helped fake her death three years prior and the two have been in a relationship ever since. Raven leads Logan through the facility, where he encounters the Sentinels' mutant-hating inventor, Bolivar Trask. After cutting off Trask's hand to access Wraith's prison with his handprint, Logan rescues Wraith and destroys a large prototype Sentinel.

Wraith leads Logan to Fred Dukes, a former team member, who, after being bested by Logan in a fight, tells him of "The Island", a prison for mutants Creed captures on Stryker's behalf, and the location of Remy Lebeau, the island's sole mutant escapee, who is currently residing at a casino in New Orleans. Remy flees when Logan questions him, thinking he is one of Stryker's agents, while Sabretooth surprises and kills Wraith. After battling Logan, Remy is convinced he is not with Stryker and takes him to the Stryker's island base.

There, Logan confronts Stryker and discovers Kayla is not only alive but a mutant who seduced Logan with her persuasion ability. Her "death" was an elaborate ruse to trick Logan into volunteering for Weapon X to acquire his DNA. Stryker's true plan is to complete the transformation of Wade into "Weapon XI": grafting onto him the powers of various mutants (including Wraith and Logan) to create the ultimate mutant-killing supersoldier. Devastated by the truth, Logan accepts Stryker's offer to erase his memory, but changes his mind after Creed takes Kayla hostage. Logan bests Creed this time, but spares him at Kayla's pleadings. While Kayla leaves to rescue her sister whom Stryker kidnapped to force her cooperation, Weapon XI is sent to kill Logan. Despite Weapon XI's capabilities, he dies by Logan's hand in the ensuing battle. Creed recovers and amicably parts ways with Logan but intends to remind his brother that they are both killers at heart.

Logan finds Kayla wounded and near death; Stryker takes the opportunity to shoot him in the head with an adamantium bullet, erasing all of his memories. Kayla persuades Stryker to walk "until [his] feet bleed", says a tearful goodbye to the unconscious Logan, and drowns herself in a lake. Logan heals from the gunshot but awakens aimless and alone.

The epilogue takes place in the same time period as the prologue: Trask has taken Logan hostage and replaced his severed hand with a lifelike robotic prosthesis. Logan breaks free of his chains and Trask flees. As an army of Sentinels ravages a ruined city in the distance, Logan quips "This world may be broken, but I've got the tools to fix it".

Development
In May 2009, Raven Software set up a developers blog. Blur Studio, who also worked with Raven on X-Men Legends II: Rise of Apocalypse and Marvel: Ultimate Alliance, provided all of the CGI cutscenes for the game.  From January to March, the developers published a large number of 3D screenshots. The music for the game was composed by Paul Haslinger. Raven worked with publisher Activision to provide easter eggs from other games to be found, such as the Lich King's sword from World of Warcraft: Wrath of the Lich King and the cake mentioned in the game Portal.

Downloadable content
In June 2009, Activision released downloadable content for the Xbox 360 and PlayStation 3 versions, featuring Custom Combat Arena, Ladder Challenge, and Environmental Simulator.

Reception

The Uncaged Edition version received generally positive reviews, whereas other versions of the game attained mostly mixed to negative reviews. In general, strong points has been identified in the violence consistent with the comic version of the character and the aesthetic value, whereas the shortness of the campaign, the lack of replay value and the repetitiveness of action have been criticized.

IGNs Greg Miller stated the Uncaged Edition version of the game is an "awesome guilty pleasure", despite criticisms of fights repetitiveness. Miller appreciated the cinematic of the game, as well its bloody sights. Overall, the visuals received a mixed review from IGN, stating "the game looks great sometimes and shoddy other times". Miller further criticized that the only noteworthy sounds are Hugh Jackman's voice and the claws sound. Whilst the game was marked with an overall 7.8/10 ('good'), the PS2 and Wii were marked respectively 4.5 ('bad') and 4.8 ('poor'). The shortcomings of the two ports lay, among others, in the general lack of music during fights, poor controls and bad textures.

The different reception based on the game port was confirmed by the review aggregators GameRankings and Metacritic. While the ranking for PC, PS3 and Xbox 360 on both aggregators was around 75/100, the Nintendo DS' and Wii's rankings stood significantly behind, with the PSP port ranked around the middle.

GameSpot gave the game a 7/10, praising the variety of enemies, the brutal action and the representation of Wolverine's power, yet criticizing the poor replay value and the disappointing boss fights. Overall, the game was defined as "one of the better movie tie-ins released recently". Destructoids review, which gave the game a 7.5/10, focused on similar points, by finding fault with boss fights, poor replay value and sloppy plot and identifying as strong points the quality of the aesthetic and the brutal action.

Eurogamer gave the game a 5/10, by stating: "X-Men Origins may be unapologetically violent, but it's also unapologetically repetitive, and it's the one apology that needs to be made". Game Informer, even though disapproved the repetitiveness, stated that the "game is nearly impossible to put down". GamePro stated that "its repetitive gameplay, mundane puzzle design and eye-twitching platforming segments really cuts into Origins fun and yet, for fans of the franchise, it's a solid title that's worth playing through".

Accolades
In the ScrewAttack "Top 10 Movie-Based Games", the Uncaged Edition of this game came in sixth. At the 2009 Spike Video Game Awards, the game was awarded the "Best Cast" award as well as Hugh Jackman receiving the 'Best Performance By A Human Male' award as Wolverine. In IGNs 'Top 5 Favorite Wolverine Games', the Uncaged Edition of the game came in first. In GameSpys "Top 10 Best Superhero PC Games", the Uncaged Edition of the game came in tenth.

References

External links
 
 
 
 
 

2009 video games
Action-adventure games
Activision games
Games for Windows certified games
Griptonite Games
Hack and slash games
M-Rated Marvel Comics video games
Nintendo DS games
PlayStation 2 games
PlayStation 3 games
PlayStation Portable games
Superhero video games
Unreal Engine games
Video games based on Marvel Comics films
Video games based on X-Men films
Video games based on adaptations
Video games scored by Paul Haslinger
Video games set in Angola
Video games set in Canada
Video games set in Japan
Video games set in Nevada
Video games set in New Orleans
Video games set in Pennsylvania
Video games set in the United States
Video games set on fictional islands
Wii games
Windows games
Wolverine (comics) video games
Xbox 360 games
Wolverine (film series)
Video games developed in the United States
Amaze Entertainment games
Single-player video games